Beryozki is a rural locality (a khutor) in Zimnyatskoye Rural Settlement, Serafimovichsky District, Volgograd Oblast, Russia. The population was 151 as of 2010. There are 3 streets.

Geography 
Beryozki is located on the Don River, 5 km north of Serafimovich (the district's administrative centre) by road. Serafimovich is the nearest rural locality.

References 

Rural localities in Serafimovichsky District